Mozammel Haque Samaji is a Bangladesh Awami League politician and the former Member of Parliament of Dhaka-11.

Career
Samaji was elected to parliament from Dhaka-11 as an Awami League candidate in 1973.

References

Awami League politicians
1937 births
1984 deaths
1st Jatiya Sangsad members